The 2021–22 Håndboldligaen (known as the HTH Herreligaen) was the 86th season of the Danish Handball League, the top men's handball league in Denmark. A total of fourteen teams contested this season's league, which began on 10 September 2021 and concluded on 12 June 2022.

GOG won their eighth title.

Teams

Arenas and locations
The following 15 clubs competed in the Håndboldligaen during the 2021–22 season:

Regular season

League table

Second round

Championship round

Group 1

Group 2

Relegation round

Playoffs

Semifinals
Semifinals were played best-of-three format.

|}

Finals

|}

Game 1

Game 2

GOG won the Finals 52–51 on aggregate.

Third place series

|}

Promotion/relegation play-offs
The 13th-placed teams of the Håndboldligaen faces the 2nd and 3rd-placed team of the 1st Division. The Promotion/relegation play-offs were played best-of-three format. The winner of these tournament was promoted to Håndboldligaen and the other teams relegated to 1st Division. 

</onlyinclude>

Final standings

Statistics

Top goalscorers

All-Star team
The all-star team was announced on 1 June 2022.

See also
 2021 Danish Cup
 2021–22 1st Division

References

External links
Danish Handball Federaration 

Denmark
Handball
Handball
Handball competitions in Denmark